Springfield Rifle is an American Western film directed by Andre DeToth and released by Warner Bros. Pictures in 1952. The film is set during the American Civil War and stars Gary Cooper, with Phyllis Thaxter and Lon Chaney Jr.

It is described as "essentially an espionage thriller that pits a Union intelligence officer (Gary Cooper) against a Confederate spy ring."

Plot
A Confederate spy has been informing rustlers about the timing and route of horse herds being driven by the Union Army, enabling the herds to be seized. Charged with cowardice when he abandons such a herd in the face of greater numbers, Major Lex Kearney is drummed out of the Union Army with a dishonorable discharge. His disgrace is complete, with wife Erin even informing him that their ashamed son has run away. What no one knows is that Kearney has accepted a fake discharge so he can carry out a top-secret assignment to go undercover to find the rustlers and the spy who has been giving them the information. A shipment of the new rapid loading Springfield rifles arrives, providing an opportunity.

Cast (in credited order)
 Gary Cooper as Major Alex 'Lex' Kearney
 Phyllis Thaxter as Erin Kearney
 David Brian as Austin McCool
 Paul Kelly as Lt. Col. John Hudson 
 Philip Carey as Capt. Tennick
 Lon Chaney, Jr. as Pete Elm
 James Millican as Matthew Quint
 Guinn 'Big Boy' Williams as Sgt. Snow
 Alan Hale Jr. as Mizzell
 Martin Milner as Pvt. Olie Larsen
 Wilton Graff as Col. George SharpeRest
 Fess Parker (uncredited) as Confederate Sergeant Jim Randolph

Reception
The film was not well received by critics. Jeffrey Meyers noted that Cooper's career went down hill in the early 1950s, until High Noon opened in 1952, and labelled Springfield Rifle a "mediocre" western.

Rebecca Fish Ewan called the film "confusing" and said that Cooper looked "ever perplexed".
New York magazine said "even Cooper can't keep this film from being just another ho-hum Western."

However, New York Life described it as an "exciting military melodrama of espionage and counterespionage in a frontier fort."

References

External links
 
 

1952 films
1952 Western (genre) films
American Western (genre) films
Western (genre) cavalry films
Films shot in Lone Pine, California
Films directed by Andre DeToth
Films scored by Max Steiner
American Civil War spy films
Films set in 1864
1950s English-language films
1950s American films